South Hackensack is a township in Bergen County, in the U.S. state of New Jersey. As of the 2020 United States census, the township's population was 2,701, an increase of 323 (+13.6%) from the 2010 census count of 2,378, which in turn reflected an increase of 129 (+5.7%) from the 2,249 counted in the 2000 census.

South Hackensack was formed as a township by an act of the New Jersey Legislature on November 15, 1935, replacing Lodi Township, based on the results of a referendum held November 5, 1935, which passed by a margin of 309 to 15. The township's name derives from its location relative to Hackensack.

Geography
According to the United States Census Bureau, the township had a total area of 0.75 square miles (1.94 km2), including 0.72 square miles (1.86 km2) of land and 0.03 square miles (0.08 km2) of water (4.27%).

As a result of the formation of boroughs within its previous limits, South Hackensack is split into three discontiguous sections.  The northeastern, primary residential section is adjacent to Hackensack, Little Ferry and Teterboro. A small western portion, known as Garfield Park, is sandwiched in between Garfield, Lodi, Wallington and Wood-Ridge, while a southern sliver containing only industrial properties lies in the Meadowlands between Carlstadt, Moonachie, and Ridgefield.

Along with other municipalities in the Bergen County area, South Hackensack is a suburb of New York City.

Demographics

2010 census

The Census Bureau's 2006–2010 American Community Survey showed that (in 2010 inflation-adjusted dollars) median household income was $70,500 (with a margin of error of +/− $9,389) and the median family income was $81,919 (+/− $8,497). Males had a median income of $55,250 (+/− $13,321) versus $33,472 (+/− $11,009) for females. The per capita income for the borough was $30,777 (+/− $2,660). About 3.4% of families and 6.0% of the population were below the poverty line, including 5.7% of those under age 18 and 1.6% of those age 65 or over.

Same-sex couples headed 5 households in 2010, an increase from the 4 counted in 2000.

2000 census
As of the 2000 United States census there were 2,249 people, 811 households, and 593 families residing in the township.  The population density was 3,161.2 people per square mile (1,223.0/km2). There were 830 housing units at an average density of 1,166.6 per square mile (451.4/km2). The racial makeup of the township was 82.93% White, 2.18% African American, 0.22% Native American, 5.74% Asian, 0.31% Pacific Islander, 6.31% from other races, and 2.31% from two or more races. Hispanic or Latino of any race were 15.07% of the population.

As of the 2000 Census, 36.3% of township residents were of Italian ancestry, the 11th-highest percentage of any municipality in the United States, and fourth-highest in New Jersey, among all places with more than 1,000 residents identifying their ancestry.

There were 811 households, out of which 27.7% had children under the age of 18 living with them, 54.7% were married couples living together, 13.1% had a female householder with no husband present, and 26.8% were non-families. 23.1% of all households were made up of individuals, and 9.7% had someone living alone who was 65 years of age or older.  The average household size was 2.77 and the average family size was 3.27.

In the township the population was spread out, with 19.7% under the age of 18, 8.8% from 18 to 24, 31.4% from 25 to 44, 23.7% from 45 to 64, and 16.5% who were 65 years of age or older.  The median age was 38 years. For every 100 females, there were 92.7 males.  For every 100 females age 18 and over, there were 90.6 males.

The median income for a household in the township was $57,917, and the median income for a family was $66,071. Males had a median income of $39,918 versus $32,344 for females. The per capita income for the township was $27,128.  About 5.2% of families and 7.1% of the population were below the poverty line, including 8.5% of those under age 18 and 6.2% of those age 65 or over.

Government

Local government
South Hackensack is governed under the Township form of New Jersey municipal government, one of 141 municipalities (of the 564) statewide that use this form, the second-most commonly used form of government in the state. The Township Committee has five members, who are elected directly by the voters at-large in partisan elections to serve three-year terms of office on a staggered basis, with either one or two seats coming up for election each year as part of the November general election in a three-year cycle. At an annual reorganization meeting, the Township Committee selects one of its members to serve as Mayor and another as Deputy Mayor. The Township Committee is composed entirely of residents from the main section of the township, although Garfield Park residents are active in the zoning and planning boards. While South Hackensack has its own police department serving all three portions of the township, the neighboring borough of Wallington provides other emergency services for Garfield Park.

, members of the Township Committee are Mayor Gary Brugger (D, term on committee ends December 31, 2024; term as mayor ends 2023), Deputy Mayor Yris Encarnacion (D, term on committee ends 2025; term as deputy mayor ends 2023), James A. Anzevino (D, 2023), Frank X. Cagas (D, 2024), and Luis E. Perdomo (D, 2023).

Federal, state and county representation 
South Hackensack is located in the 9th Congressional District and is part of New Jersey's 36th state legislative district. Prior to the 2011 reapportionment following the 2010 Census, South Hackensack had been in the 38th state legislative district.

Politics 
As of March 2011, there were a total of 1,300 registered voters in South Hackensack Township, of which 302 (23.2% vs. 31.7% countywide) were registered as Democrats, 309 (23.8% vs. 21.1%) were registered as Republicans and 688 (52.9% vs. 47.1%) were registered as Unaffiliated. There was one voter registered to another party. Among the township's 2010 Census population, 54.7% (vs. 57.1% in Bergen County) were registered to vote, including 70.0% of those ages 18 and over (vs. 73.7% countywide).

In the 2016 presidential election, Democrat Hillary Clinton received 565 votes (53.0% vs. 54.2% countywide), ahead of Republican Donald Trump with 473 votes (44.3% vs. 41.1%) and other candidates with 29 votes (2.7% vs. 4.6%), among the 1,094 ballots cast by the township's 1,484 registered voters, for a turnout of 73.7% (vs. 72.5% in Bergen County).. In the 2012 presidential election, Democrat Barack Obama received 551 votes (57.2% vs. 54.8% countywide), ahead of Republican Mitt Romney with 389 votes (40.4% vs. 43.5%) and other candidates with 11 votes (1.1% vs. 0.9%), among the 963 ballots cast by the township's 1,368 registered voters, for a turnout of 70.4% (vs. 70.4% in Bergen County). In the 2008 presidential election, Democrat Barack Obama received 541 votes (50.1% vs. 53.9% countywide), ahead of Republican John McCain with 512 votes (47.5% vs. 44.5%) and other candidates with 12 votes (1.1% vs. 0.8%), among the 1,079 ballots cast by the township's 1,385 registered voters, for a turnout of 77.9% (vs. 76.8% in Bergen County). In the 2004 presidential election, Republican George W. Bush received 499 votes (49.9% vs. 47.2% countywide), ahead of Democrat John Kerry with 485 votes (48.5% vs. 51.7%) and other candidates with 8 votes (0.8% vs. 0.7%), among the 999 ballots cast by the township's 1,377 registered voters, for a turnout of 72.5% (vs. 76.9% in the whole county).

In the 2013 gubernatorial election, Republican Chris Christie received 56.2% of the vote (355 cast), ahead of Democrat Barbara Buono with 37.7% (238 votes), and other candidates with 6.2% (39 votes), among the 653 ballots cast by the township's 1,343 registered voters (21 ballots were spoiled), for a turnout of 48.6%. In the 2009 gubernatorial election, Republican Chris Christie received 333 votes (43.6% vs. 45.8% countywide), ahead of Democrat Jon Corzine with 329 votes (43.1% vs. 48.0%), Independent Chris Daggett with 34 votes (4.5% vs. 4.7%) and other candidates with 5 votes (0.7% vs. 0.5%), among the 763 ballots cast by the township's 1,351 registered voters, yielding a 56.5% turnout (vs. 50.0% in the county).

Education 
Public school students in pre-kindergarten through eighth grade are served by the South Hackensack School District at Memorial School. As of the 2020–21 school year, the district, comprised of one school, had an enrollment of 286 students and 23.4 classroom teachers (on an FTE basis), for a student–teacher ratio of 12.2:1.

Students attending public school for ninth through twelfth grades attend Hackensack High School as part of a sending/receiving relationship with the Hackensack Public Schools, together with students from Rochelle Park, with approximately 80 students from South Hackensack attending the high school as of 2012. As of the 2020–21 school year, the high school had an enrollment of 1,806 students and 137.8 classroom teachers (on an FTE basis), for a student–teacher ratio of 13.1:1.

Public school students from the borough, and all of Bergen County, are eligible to attend the secondary education programs offered by the Bergen County Technical Schools, which include the Bergen County Academies in Hackensack, and the Bergen Tech campus in Teterboro or Paramus. The district offers programs on a shared-time or full-time basis, with admission based on a selective application process and tuition covered by the student's home school district.

Transportation

Roads and highways 

Interstate 80 crosses the main portion of the township, while U.S. Route 46 skirts its southern border and County Route 503 goes along its eastern border.

Public transportation 
NJ Transit provides bus service between the township and the Port Authority Bus Terminal in Midtown Manhattan on the 161 and 165 routes, to Newark on the 76 route, with local service offered on the 772 route.

Sources
 Municipal Incorporations of the State of New Jersey (according to Counties) prepared by the Division of Local Government, Department of the Treasury (New Jersey); December 1, 1958.
 Clayton, W. Woodford; and Nelson, William. History of Bergen and Passaic Counties, New Jersey, with Biographical Sketches of Many of its Pioneers and Prominent Men. Philadelphia: Everts and Peck, 1882.
 Harvey, Cornelius Burnham (ed.), Genealogical History of Hudson and Bergen Counties, New Jersey. New York: New Jersey Genealogical Publishing Co., 1900.
 Van Valen, James M. History of Bergen County, New Jersey. New York: New Jersey Publishing and Engraving Co., 1900.
 Westervelt, Frances A. (Frances Augusta), 1858–1942, History of Bergen County, New Jersey, 1630–1923, Lewis Historical Publishing Company, 1923.

References

External links

South Hackensack Township official website

 
1935 establishments in New Jersey
New Jersey Meadowlands District
Populated places established in 1935
Township form of New Jersey government
Townships in Bergen County, New Jersey
Discontiguous municipalities in New Jersey